The 2018 Knowsley Metropolitan Borough Council Election took place on 3 May 2018 to elect members of Knowsley Metropolitan Borough Council in England. This was on the same day as other local elections.

After the election, the composition of the council was:

Election Results

Overall election result

Overall result compared with 2016.

Changes in council composition

Prior to the election the composition of the council was:

After the election, the composition of the council was:

Votes summary

Seats summary

Ward results

Results compared directly with the last local election in 2016.

Cherryfield

Halewood North

Halewood South

Northwood

Page Moss

Prescot North

Prescot South

Roby

Shevington

St Gabriel's

St Michael's

Stockbridge

Swanside

Whiston and Cronton

Whitefield

Changes between 2018 and 2019

Halewood South by-election 2018

Notes

• italics denote a sitting councillor • bold denotes the winning candidate

References

2018 English local elections
2018
2010s in Merseyside